Micronauts is a North American science fiction toyline manufactured and marketed by Mego from 1976 to 1980. The Micronauts toyline was based on and licensed from the Microman toyline created by Japanese-based toy company Takara in 1974.

Mego discontinued the Micronauts line in 1980 prior to the company’s bankruptcy and dissolution in 1982. Years after Mego’s demise, other toy companies, such as Palisades Toys and SOTA (State of the Art) Toys, have attempted to revive the toyline.

Description
The Micronauts toyline consisted of  action figures which were known for their high number of articulation points relative to other toys of similar size and scale in the 1970s. The toyline also included vehicles, robots, playsets and accessories. Many of the Micronauts toys used interchangeable  connectors and ports that allowed parts to be transferred and connected between different toys.

History

Takara

Takara first released Microman toys in Japan in 1974 as a smaller version of their popular  and  1972 Henshin Cyborg (Transforming Cyborg) line. Henshin Cyborg figures were based on Combat Joe figures—which themselves were based on Hasbro's G.I. Joe figures—with their bodies molded in clear plastic, exposing their inner workings and supposed cybernetic parts.

By downscaling their size, Takara sought to create a toyline that would offset the sheer cost of producing a full line of plastic-based figures and related playsets as well as acknowledging that basic living space is limited for most Japanese households. Smaller Microman figures would not only cost less to produce during the energy crisis of the 1970s, the line's smaller scale would also take up less physical space in a household and thus be more attractive to space conscious consumers in the Japanese market.

In Japan, the Microman figures themselves were marketed as actually being  cyborg entities that hailed from a fictional planet known as "Micro Earth" and disguised themselves as action figures while on Earth.

Mego

In 1976, Mego licensed several Microman toys from Takara and marketed the toyline in North America and other countries as Micronauts. During their initial series 1 and series 2 release, Takara produced small quantities of products in Japan before production was officially moved to Mego's facilities in Hong Kong.

While much of the initial Micronaut toyline offerings were simply repackaged versions of Takara Microman equivalents, some items in the Micronaut toyline were original Mego creations that used modified and reconfigured parts from existing Takara toys. For example, the larger,  magnetic action figures Baron Karza and Force Commander were re-colorings of the Magnemo Kotetsu Jeeg action figures with newly designed heads. In addition, as the Micronaut line grew in popularity, Mego expanded the line by creating whole new figures from scratch such as the "Aliens" line which included Antron, Repto, Membros, Lobros, Kronos and Centaurus.

The Micronaut toyline sold extremely well for Mego. According to Neal Kublan, Mego’s Executive VP of Marketing/Vice President of Mego Research & Development (1972-1980), the line generated more than $32 million in sales for the $110 million company during one period.

After Mego's 1982 bankruptcy and dissolution, the original molds for many of the toys were sold to Hourtoys/M&D Toys for their Interchangables discount toyline, other original molds were sold to PAC Toys for use in their Lords of Light toyline and even Takara produced several series 5 toys for Italian licensee/distributor Gig's i Micronauti line. Additionally, leftover Micronaut toyline stock from Mego's production run was eventually sold for sale/clearance in North America by Lion Rock Limited under the Micronauts name.

Mego Micronaut releases
Below is a basic overview list of Mego Micronaut toys with size/scale, release dates and Mego series numbers as well as cross-referenced information connected to the Takara equivalent toys they were based on; Microman and otherwise. This is not meant to be a comprehensive list of all Mego releases/variants but rather a high-level overview of their Micronaut line offerings.

Palisades Toys

In 2002 Palisades Toys acquired the rights to manufacture a new line of Micronauts toys from Abrams Gentile Entertainment, LLC, the company which was formed in the aftermath of Mego's collapse to retain and manage Mego's licensing contracts, rights and deals. This licensing agreement was done by Palisades under the assumption that the original manufacturing tooling and molds from the 1970s Mego toyline were still available. When Palisades discovered the manufacturing tooling and molds were not available, it turned to the Micronaut/Microman collector's community to donate vintage toys so Palisades could create new molds to replicate the figures. Most of the Palisades reissues were Mego Micronaut figures based on Takara designs, but several original alien designs from the original Mego toyline (such as Repto, Membros and Centaurus) were included in the line as well.

When initial manufacturing of the Palisades figures was completed and the new, retro line shipped to consumers and stores, many figures were found to have defective or broken parts caused by manufacturing practices followed by the first Chinese factory. Many consumers who returned defective merchandise were inadvertently given defective replacements by Palisades.

Facing these issues, Palisades developed the Series 2 figures which utilized other, more reputable factories in China, but ended up losing more money than expected. As a result, retailers were wary of carrying the new Micronauts toyline, which resulted in the abrupt cancellation of a third series which was already in development. The whole series of events contributed to Palisades’ bankruptcy in 2006.

Palisades Toys Micronaut releases
Below is a basic overview list of Palisades Toys Micronaut toys with size/scale and release dates. This is not meant to be a comprehensive list of all Palisades Toys releases/variants but rather a high-level overview of their Micronaut line offerings.

SOTA Toys

In January 2005, SOTA (State of the Art) Toys unveiled plans for a collector's toyline called "Micronauts: Evolution" which would be a redesign of the Micronauts figures presented in a slightly larger  size. Concept art was released and prototypes displayed at the 2005 Toy Fair, with a projected release of late 2005. The figures appeared at the 2006 San Diego Comic Con.

The initial series was planned to include  renditions of Lobros, Baron Karza, and Space Glider. Plans changed to an online-only box set of all three characters, available on SOTA's website as smaller figures.

In September 2006, SOTA president Jerry Macaluso said "the retail environment for collectibles is in the gutter right now", and many stores wishing to order the "Micronauts: Evolution" line were going bankrupt. He noted that the Palisades line "disaster…had a huge negative effect", with retailers rejecting SOTA’s upcoming series. Macaluso hoped to release the line in 2007 before SOTA's license expired, and considered funding it himself but the line was never produced.

Proposed SOTA Micronaut releases
Below is a basic overview list of proposed SOTA Micronauts releases. Since no products were actually produced this is simply a high-level overview of their proposed Micronaut line offerings.

Hasbro

In June 2016, Hasbro announced the special release of a limited edition Micronauts Classic Collection toy set. The set included three Micronaut characters: Galactic Warrior, Pharoid and Orbital Defender and featured packaging artwork by artist Ken Kelly. The set debuted at the San Diego Comic Con.

Hasbro Micronaut releases
Below is a basic overview list of Hasbro Micronaut toys with size/scale and release dates.

In other media

Comic books

Several comic book series based on the Micronaut toyline have been published by Marvel Comics (from 1979–1986), Image Comics (2002–2003), Devil’s Due Publishing (2004), and IDW (2016–2018).

Film

Feature-film developments
In November 2009 during an "Investor Day" event held at Hasbro's headquarters in Pawtucket, Rhode Island, Hasbro's VP of Global Designs, Brian Chapman, announced the company's re-introduction of the Micronaut toyline and hinted that director J. J. Abrams’ Bad Robot Productions was in negotiations to produce a film based on the Micronauts property. In March 2013, Rhett Reese and Paul Wernick mentioned they were working on a screenplay and the film was on Paramount's list of possible productions. Wernick said that they wrote a couple of drafts with Bad Robot Productions and their script was deviating from the comic, but described the adaptation as "cool and different". The planned project made little progress, though in November 2015, Paramount said that it was still planning a Micronauts film adaptation.

That December, Hasbro and Paramount were planning a cinematic universe combining Micronauts with G.I. Joe, Visionaries: Knights of the Magical Light, M.A.S.K. and Rom. Several writers such as Michael Chabon, Brian K. Vaughan, Nicole Perlman, Lindsey Beer, Cheo Coker, John Francis Daley, Jonathan Goldstein, Joe Robert Cole, Jeff Pinkner, Nicole Riegel and Geneva Robertson-Dworet joined the writers room in April 2016. The release date was originally scheduled for October 2020, before it was pushed for June 2021.

In 2019, Dean DeBlois was attached as the writer and director of the film, but the film was pulled from the release schedule in November 2020.

Animation

In 1998, AGE, Annex Entertainment, Gribouille and Kaleidoscope Media Group planned to produce a Micronauts animated series starting with a five-part miniseries to air on the Sci Fi Channel in Fall of 1998, followed by a syndicated 26 episode Micronauts animated series for 1999, with action figures and a Marvel tie-in comic announced. The project was later cancelled.

Boulder Media Limited (a subsidiary of Hasbro Studios) planned to develop a new Micronauts animated series but has long since been delayed. The status of the series is currently unknown due to the closure of Allspark Animation in 2020 and the live-action film being pulled from schedule. In 2022, Hasbro sold Boulder Media to Australian media company Princess Pictures.

References

1970s toys
1980s toys
Action figures
Hasbro brands
Hasbro products
Takara Tomy franchises
Mass media franchises introduced in 1976
1980 disestablishments in the United States